Theodora Doukaina (before 1059– after 1075) was a Byzantine princess and dogaressa.

Life
Theodora Doukaina was the second daughter of Byzantine emperor Constantine X Dukas by his unknown first wife. After 1071 she became the wife of Domenico Selvo, Doge of Venice, who received the title of protoproedros at the occasion.

As she is mentioned as alive in the work of Michael Psellos (1075), it is assumed she died after this last date. It is not known if she had children, and she is not mentioned otherwise.

Confusion with Maria Argyropoulaina 
Peter Damian, the Cardinal Bishop of Ostia, wrote a chapter entitled "De Veneti ducis uxore quae prius nimium delicata, demum toto corpore computruit" ("Of the Venetian Doge's wife, whose body, after her excessive delicacy, entirely rotted away.") about an unnamed Byzantine princess whose manners he considered scandalously lavish and which brought to her a horrible death as a divine punishment. 
This woman has been mistakenly (since Damian died 1072) identified with Domenico Selvo's wife by later Venetian chroniclers (incl. Andrea Dandolo and Marino Sanuto the Younger) followed afterwards by various modern authors; however since the work in which Damianus' chapter is contained is dated ca 1059 it refers probably to Maria Argyropoulaina who had died a half century before.

Notes

Bibliography 

 
 Hodgson, Francis Cotterell. The Early History of Venice: From the Foundation to the Conquest of Constantinople, A.D. 1204. G. Allen, 1901. pp. 191–192

Works confusing Theodora and Maria 
Henisch, Bridget Ann (1976), Fast and Feast: Food in Medieval Society 
Staley, Edgcumbe (c1910), The Dogaressas of Venice

|-

1050s births
Daughters of Byzantine emperors
Theodora
11th-century Byzantine women
Dogaressas of Venice
11th-century Venetian women